Minor Blues is an album by pianist Kenny Barron recorded in New York in 2009 and released on the Japanese Venus label.

Reception 

In the review on AllMusic, Ken Dryden noted "This is yet another fine example of Kenny Barron's superb chops in a small-group setting".

Track listing 
 "Minor Blues" (Kenny Barron) – 6:29
 "Beautiful Love" (Wayne King, Victor Young, Egbert Van Alstyne, Haven Gillespie) – 6:55
 "Emily" (Johnny Mandel, Johnny Mercer) – 6:51
 "For Heaven's Sake" (Elise Bretton, Sherman Edwards, Donald Meyer) – 9:00
 "How Deep Is the Ocean?" (Irving Berlin) – 8:16
 "Too Late Now" (Burton Lane, Alan Jay Lerner) – 8:34
 "Don't Explain" (Billie Holiday, Arthur Herzog Jr.) – 6:30
 "Hush-a-Bye" (Ambroise Thomas, Sammy Fain, Jerry Seelen) – 6:22
 "I've Never Been in Love Before" (Frank Loesser) – 6:49
 "My Ideal" (Leo Robin, Richard A. Whiting, Newell Chase) – 6:37

Personnel 
Kenny Barron – piano
George Mraz – bass
Ben Riley – drums

References 

Kenny Barron albums
2009 albums
Venus Records albums